The Panama Defense Forces (FFDD) and formerly the National Guard of Panama, were the armed forces of the Republic of Panama. It was created in 1983 led by General Manuel Antonio Noriega and his general staff. It was dismantled by the Armed Forces of the United States after the U.S. invasion of Panama in 1989.

History 

Before the coup d'état in Panama of 1968 that overthrew President Arnulfo Arias Madrid, the military police were called National Guard. Since the 1950s and under the command of Colonel and President José Antonio Remón Cantera. He negotiated with the U.S. president Dwight D. Eisenhower issues of sovereignty and defense of the Panama Canal, obtaining important equipment for the police and the National Guard, as well as the training of pilots in Colombia and officers in the United States Military Academy. In 1964, the National Guard of Panama avoided having a conflict with the Armed Forces of the United States on Martyrs Day, staying quartered. In 1968, after the triumph of Arnulfo Arias in the elections and a few days after the swearing in of the same, there was a meeting between Arias and the high officers of the National Guard, General Vallarino, Colonels Pinilla and Urrutia and Lieutenant Colonel Torrijos, to agree on Vallarino's retirement, in return Arias would respect the law of the ladder.

President Arnulfo Arias Madrid assumed on October 1, 1968, on October 10, the retirement ceremony of General Bolívar Vallarino, outgoing commander of the National Guard and unexpectedly the forced retirement of Colonel José María Pinilla Fábrega incoming commander, was held appointed Colonel Bolívar Urrutia as commander in chief and Lieutenant Colonel Aristides Hassán, second commander in chief of the National Guard, as well as a series of abrupt changes and transfers which violated the law of the ranks and the agreement reached between President Arias and the high command of the National Guard. In response to this, on October 11, Major Boris Martínez, head of the Chiriquí military zone and Lieutenant Colonel Omar Torrijos Herrera, who until now served as Executive Secretary of the National Guard command commanded the military coup against President Arias Madrid, the coup leaders offered the presidency to Ricardo J. Alfaro and Raúl Arango, who at the time of the coup was the vice president of the republic and commander of the Benemérito Fire Corps of Panama who declined the offer of the military, Therefore, they decided to create the Government Military Board, which was headed by Colonels José María Pinilla and Bolívar Urrutia. All liberties and political rights of Panamanian citizenship were abolished, the 1946 Constitution was repealed and major transformations of political and social order in the Panamanian nation were initiated. During this time there were guerrilla movements in the city and in the interior of the country by the Panamanian left and the supporters of the ousted President Arias Madrid. There were also acts of war and sabotage against the government and the National Guard, freedom of expression was strongly censored by closing newspapers. The issuance of pamphlets and clandestine writings was developed. On February 24, 1969, Colonel Torrijos with a group of officers who supported in a maneuver as part of the intestine fights stun Colonel Boris Martínez and sent him on a plane to Miami as a military attache which he rejected and never had ties with the military staying to live there as an asylee.

By December 1969, while General Omar Torrijos already attended an equestrian competition which his friend Fernando Eleta Almarán had invited his friend, a conspiracy composed of Colonels José María Pinilla, Bolívar Urrutia, Amado Sanjur, they tried to overthrow him, but Torrijos was supported by the then Major Manuel Antonio Noriega who served as head of the Chiriquí military zone, receiving him on the night of December 16, 1969, this day is called Loyalty Day, once Torrijos entered Chiriquí the caravan of military and civilians who supported him grew as he went along from Chiriquí, to the presidency of the republic which defeated all coup attempts, definitively consolidating Torrijos in power. The National Guard crushed all opposition movements towards 1970.

After crushing the opposition movements, the already general Omar Torrijos Herrera took control and established in 1972 a National Assembly of Representatives, who immediately named him "Chief of State of the Panamanian Revolution." This military body established a system of nationalist vindication, to which part of the private sector joined, and the country went through a period of social and cultural transformations, with the recovery of the Panama Canal as the main objective of Torrijos, and the creation of the ruling party, Democratic Revolutionary Party (PRD). At the same time, harmful and denounced characteristics were evidenced, such as armed repression, censorship of the printed press and the disappearance of political opponents at the beginning of said government. The Torrijos-Carter Treaties signed in 1977, demanded from the regime (called "the process" by its militants) democratization, its quartering and the call for elections.

By 1978, General Torrijos abandoned power, but maintained control of the National Guard. After his death in a strange plane crash on July 31, 1981, - where the main suspect was the CIA for not complying with the requirements of the World Bank - the National Guard was involved in a power struggle between the military commanders involved. Colonel Florencio Flores took possession of the position of commander in chief for a few months, until after a conspiracy among senior officials of the General Staff they overthrow him by sending him to retirement. Given this, the conspiracy officers create a succession agreement to the command known as the Torrijos plan in which the first to ascend to the command would be Lieutenant Colonel Rubén Darío Paredes, then Lieutenant Colonel Armando Contreras will follow, Lieutenant Colonel Manuel Antonio Noriega would follow and culminate with Lieutenant Colonel Roberto Díaz Herrera, the self-proclaimed General Rubén Darío Paredes Del Río decided with his staff to carry out certain repressive actions against the media opposing the regime censuring some media. In a maneuver for power General Paredes retires Colonel Armando Contreras who had already reached the time to ascend to the command, maintaining links in front of the command until 1983.

On August 20, 1983, Colonel Noriega was promoted to general and the National Guard Command and began a period marked by dictatorial decisions. His first decree was the change of the name of the military entity to the Defense Forces of Panama, with the mentality of converting the military police into an army for the joint tasks of the defense of the Panama Canall along with the United States Army. For the reorganization of the military institution, he had the military advice of Israeli intelligence experts and reputed military officers, among them the Argentine Colonel Mohamed Ali Seineldín, veteran of the Falklands War and, at that time, military attaché of the Republic Argentina in Panama.

That year the closure of the School of the Americas was ordered, which for the CIA meant losing its base in Central America. At the end of 1983 the political strategies were prepared to launch the official candidate of the 1984 elections: Colonel Noriega convinces General Paredes to benefit from his retirement and receive the support of the State and the Defense Forces to aspire to the presidency. Then, Paredes is betrayed, since the Comandancia and the PRD launch at the last moment Dr. Nicolás Ardito Barletta as the official candidate. Once orchestrated the electoral fraud by presidential decree, Noriega is promoted to General.

Military coup of October 3, 1989 

On October 3, 1989, a military coup was planned, in which some officers, under the command of Lt. Col. Moisés Giroldi Vera, tried to overthrow General Noriega. Although they successfully captured Noriega, a loyalist counter-attack forced the officers to surrender. They were later tortured and killed. Giroldi and his subordinates intended to end the economic embargo imposed by the United States, and negotiate with the U.S. military a political solution to a war action and create a commission to review the outcome of the 1989 elections, which were cancelled to deliver the presidency to the true winner, in this case to the political party ADO Civilista, headed by Guillermo Endara, Ricardo Arias Calderón and Guillermo Ford. This would mean withdrawing General Noriega and his entire staff, as some of colonels had been in retirement for more than 12 years and were still in their positions, earning high salaries, in contrast to the troops that failed to collect more than $250 per month.

In order to clean the deteriorated image of the Defense Forces, it was decided to withdraw Noriega, but they did not count on the general already having counterattack plans when changing power. The events led to terrorist actions, such as the cyanide contamination of the Chilibre water treatment plant, and then blamed the Americans for such action. Against this plan were Lieutenant Colonel Moisés Giroldi Vera and his followers, who obviously rejected him. Moisés Giroldi was captured along with 400 other police and coup soldiers and sent to Fuerte Cimarrón, the basic military training school in Panama, and then sent to the Tinajitas Prison and Coiba, where many were tortured and subsequently executed. General Manuel Antonio Noriega then ordered all the barracks to deliver any weapons of heavy caliber, which were stored in containers under the custody of the G-2 under the command of Colonel Luis Córdoba.

Post-invasion democratic government 
When the Defense Forces were dismantled, the government of Guillermo Endara (1989–1994) was commissioned to form a new institution with the help of the U.S. Army. The force, initially a police vocation, was attached to the Public Force, idealized by the then Vice President Ricardo Arias Calderón. The new government organized it as a police force of the Panamanian state, subordinated to the executive branch; calling it National Police with the explicit purpose of providing protection to the life, honor and property of nationals wherever they are and of foreigners under the jurisdiction of their territory. Colonel Roberto Armijo was appointed as the first head of this police force.

In order to grant legal bases to the new police organization, Executive Decree No. 38 of February 10, 1990 was issued, through which the Public Force was organized, one of whose components is the National Police. The Executive appointed Colonel Eduardo Herrera Hassan as Director of that Force.  Herrera Hassán was then dismissed on charges of conspiracy in August, being replaced Lieutenant Colonel Fernando Quezada, who in turn was dismissed in October of the same year, by opening a public discussion with the director of a newspaper. Herrera Hassán attempts a coup d'état on December 5, 1990, giving his reason as a final consequence to the level of senior officers in the institution.

Structure

Land Forces 
As an army corps, members of the land forces considered themselves as police and soldiers at the same time. Until 1989 there were a total of 16,300 troops and about 3800 reservists and civil collaborators called the Dignity Battalions, trained to  resist the possible invasion of a foreign country.

The Panama Defense Forces had three combat battalions and eight infantry companies, plus special forces units. Each military zone had one or two reaction squads. The country was divided into twelve military zones, which were generally led by a major or a lieutenant colonel.

As weapons, the infantry had fifty light cannons, eight hundred heavy mortars and one thousand light mortars; Fifty KPV 14.5 x 114 Russian anti-aircraft machine guns (known as "4 Mouths"), armored vehicles V150 and V300. The infantry was armed with Russian rifles AK-47, AKM and rocket-propelled grenade launchers RPG-7 and RPG-18, in addition to U.S. weapons such as the M16-A1, M-60 machine guns and .45 caliber service guns. Another important aspect is that this park highlighted the existence of ZU-23-4 and ZU-23-2 anti-aircraft weapons, Chinese-made versions, and 4 120 mm calipers.

Notable companies 

 Battalion 2000 (Prov. de Panamá )
 Cémaco Battalion (Prov. del Darién )
 Paz Battalion (Prov. de Chiriquí )
 First Tigres de Tinajita Infantry and Fire Support Company
 Second Pumas de Tocumen Infantry Company, airborne
 Third Red Devils Infantry Company of Chiriquí, support for the Paz Battalion
 Fourth Infantry Company Urraca, Custody of the General Staff
 Fifth Victoriano Lorenzo Infantry Company, Custodiar Canal Security
 Sixth Expeditionary Infantry Company, Mechanized
 Seventh Macho de Monte Infantry Company, Commander Escort
 Eighth Military Police Company and Atlantic Battalion

Logistic support units 

 DENI - National Department of Investigations for interrogations, criminalistics and espionage. Led by Nivaldo Madriñán
 G-2 Intelligence and Counterintelligence Section. Directed by Colonels Wong, Purcell and Luis "Papo" Córdoba in 1989
 Civic action: military engineering works section, composed of reservists
 UESAT: Special Anti-Terror Security Units
 Dignity Battalions: Popular militia created in 1988, in accordance with the constitutional precept that states that: "All Panamanians are required to take up arms to defend national independence and territorial integrity of the State" (Art.310), formed by volunteers of all social classes, in order to collaborate in the national defense before the imminence of a foreign military invasion of Panama, a fact that arose in December 1989
 CODEPADI (Commission for the Defense of Homeland and Dignity): Civil Protection Corps, created to assist in the event of a foreign military invasion of Panama. Formed primarily by personnel of the civil service and led by officials of state agencies.
 Centurions: Riot control and operational support corps
 Doberman: Riot,
 Road Patrol: Highway patrol police

Special Forces 
The Special Forces Group consisted of the Explosives Unit, the Frog Men Unit, the Command Unit, the School of Commandos and Special Operations (ECOE) and the UESAT (Special Counter-Terrorism Unit) and Counterintelligence Unit.

Panamanian Air Force 

The Panamanian Air Force (Fuerza Aerea Panamena, FAP), also known as "Los Gallinazos", was founded on 17 January 1969 and its motto was Desde el Aire, Orden Paz y Lealtad (From the Air, Order Peace and Loyalty). It was headquartered in Tocumen and had bases at Curundú, David, Paitilla and Santiago. It was composed of a squad of helicopters and a squad of fixed-wing aircraft. The helicopter squad was composed of 22 helicopters that were mostly Huey or UH-1N type armed with M60 machine guns and an AS 332 Super Puma Eurocopter. The fixed-wing squadron was composed of 38 aircraft T-35 Pillán, Cessna, Twin Otter, CASA CN-235, called by the FAP in codename "Elektra", used for paratrooper and infantry forces, CASA C-212 Aviocar, Cessna 208 Caravan and a Boeing 727. It had around 500 personnel.

Panamanian National Navy 

The National Naval Force (Fuerza de Marina Nacional, FMN) was composed of a small group of patrollers and landing units. It also had a Marine Corps Company. It was founded on 17 January 1969 and its motto was "Con Bien Viento y Buena Mar" (By good wind and good sea). Its headquarters was Fort Amador. It had two fleets, an Atlantic fleet based at Coco Solo and a Pacific fleet based at the Port of Balboa. It had smaller bases at Cocos Island, Colón Island and Pedregal. It had around 500 personal and operated 8 landing craft , 2 logistics support ships made from converted landing craft, and a single troop transport.

Ranks

Commissioned officer ranks
The rank insignia for Commissioned officers.

Other ranks
The rank insignia for Non-commissioned officers and enlisted personnel.

Military regions
The Panama Defense Forces were organized by military regions which were further divided into military zones. In total there were 4 military regions and 12 military zones.

Equipment

Small Arms

Crew Served Weapons

Less Lethal Weapons

Armoured Vehicles

Unarmored Vehicles

Aircraft

Naval Vessels

References 

Disbanded armed forces
Panama history-related lists
Military history of Panama

External links 
 https://panamadefenseforce.carrd.co/ A website containing a large amount of photographs of Panama Defense Forces troops.
 https://tanks-encyclopedia.com/1989-us-invasion-of-panama/ A website detailing operation just cause, with specific information on the PDF.
 https://history.army.mil/documents/panama/pdfob.htm US Military documentation of the Panama Defense Forces Order of Battle